Don Czarcinski is a former member of the Ohio House of Representatives. He is of Polish descent.

References

1940s births
Democratic Party members of the Ohio House of Representatives
Living people
American politicians of Polish descent